Carl Bean (May 26, 1944 – September 7, 2021) was an American singer and activist who was the founding prelate of the Unity Fellowship Church Movement, a liberal protestant denomination that is particularly welcoming of lesbians, gay and bisexual African Americans. Before founding the first church of the denomination, the Unity Fellowship Church, Los Angeles, in 1975, Bean was a Motown and disco singer, noted particularly for his version of the early gay liberation song "I Was Born This Way". He was openly gay.

In 1982, Bean became an activist, working on behalf of people with AIDS.

Bean's autobiography, I Was Born This Way, came out in 2010. He died at the age of 77 in 2021.

References

Books
 – Bean's autobiography

1944 births
2021 deaths
HIV/AIDS activists
American Protestant religious leaders
American gay musicians
LGBT African Americans
American LGBT singers
LGBT Protestant clergy
American disco musicians
Motown artists
20th-century American LGBT people
21st-century American LGBT people
20th-century American clergy
21st-century American clergy
20th-century African-American male singers
20th-century American singers
20th-century American male singers
21st-century African-American people